Events from the year 1928 in Scotland.

Incumbents 

 Secretary of State for Scotland and Keeper of the Great Seal – Sir John Gilmour, Bt

Law officers 
 Lord Advocate – William Watson
 Solicitor General for Scotland – Alexander Munro MacRobert

Judiciary 
 Lord President of the Court of Session and Lord Justice General – Lord Clyde
 Lord Justice Clerk – Lord Alness
 Chairman of the Scottish Land Court – Lord St Vigeans

Events 
 11 February – formation of the National Party of Scotland, a predecessor the Scottish National Party. On 23 June it holds a demonstration at Stirling marking the anniversary of the Battle of Bannockburn.
 31 March – the Scotland national football team defeat England 5–1 at Wembley Stadium.
 28 April – June: Motorcycle speedway racing staged at Celtic Park.
 May
 The Scottish county of Forfarshire resolves to revert to its historic name of Angus.
 Carntyne Stadium in Glasgow opened for greyhound racing. Dirt track motorcycle speedway is also staged here, as is the first Scottish Greyhound Derby.
 18 June – transatlantic liner SS Duchess of Richmond is launched at John Brown & Company's shipyard at Clydebank for Canadian Pacific Steamships.
 20 July – Scottish Court of Criminal Appeal overturns Oscar Slater's 1909 murder conviction.
 26 August – in Paisley, May Donoghue finds the remains of a snail in her ginger beer, leading to the landmark negligence case Donoghue v. Stevenson.
 25 October – a passenger express runs into the rear of a derailed freight train near Dinwoodie railway station with 4 deaths.
 Grampian hydroelectricity scheme initiated.
 First high-voltage electricity pylon for the UK National Grid is erected near Edinburgh.
 Reconstruction of Paisley Abbey completed.
 Politics of Edinburgh: Progressives form a group on the local council.

Births 
 1 January – Iain Crichton Smith, poet (died 1998)
 17 January – Matt McGinn, folk singer (died 1977)
 29 February – Irene Sunters, actress (died 2005)
 10 March – Alex McAvoy, actor (died 2005)
 11 March – Sandy Mactaggart, Scottish-Canadian educator and philanthropist (died 2017)
 4 April – Jimmy Logan, born James Allan Short, entertainer (died 2001)
 24 April – Tommy Docherty, footballer and manager (died 2020 in England)
 7 April – Gael Turnbull, poet (died 2004)
 11 April – Duncan Williamson, storyteller and singer (died 2007)
 22 May – John Mackenzie, film director (died 2011)
 27 May – Thea Musgrave, classical composer
 2 June – Calum Kennedy, singer (died 2006)
 5 June – James Kennaway, novelist and screenwriter (died 1968 in England)
 29 June – Ian Bannen, actor (died 1999)
 16 July – Bryden Thomson, orchestral conductor (died 1991 in Ireland)
 8 August – Peter Keenan, boxer (died 2000)
 21 September – Con Devitt, Scottish-born New Zealand trade unionist (died 2014)
 6 October – Flora MacNeil, singer in Scottish Gaelic (died 2015)
 9 October – Joseph Brady, actor (died 2001 in London)
 28 October – Lawrie Reilly, international footballer (died 2013)
 7 December - Kay Matheson, Gaelic scholar and one of four students involved in the 1950 removal of the Stone of Scone (died 2021)
 11 December – Andy MacMillan, architect (died 2014)
 27 November – Sir Arnold Clark billionaire car dealer (died 2017)
 28 December – Ian Steel, road racing cyclist (died 2015)
 John Maxwell Anderson, consultant surgeon (died 1982)

Deaths 
 2 January – Thomas McMillan, footballer (born 1866)
 14 January – Andrew MacLeish, businessman (born 1838)
 13 April – Charles Sims, painter (born 1873 in England; suicide)
 26 May – John Burnet, classicist (born 1863)
 28 May – Sir James William Beeman Hodsdon, Scottish surgeon, president of the Royal College of Surgeons of Edinburgh, (born 1858)
 26 August – Colin Campbell, film director (born 1859)
 29 October – John Macintyre, laryngologist and pioneer radiographer (born 1857)
 13 November – Alexander William Mair, academic (born 1875; house fire)
 10 December – Charles Rennie Mackintosh, architect, designer and watercolourist (born 1868; died in London)
 24 December – Thomas Corsan Morton, painter (born 1859)

The arts
 The Fife Miner Players begin to tour Joe Corrie's play In Time o' Strife, concerning the effect of the 1926 United Kingdom general strike in the Fife Coalfield. 
 Nan Shepherd's first novel The Quarry Wood is published.

See also 
 Timeline of Scottish history
 1928 in Northern Ireland

References 

 
Years of the 20th century in Scotland
Scotland
1920s in Scotland